

re

rea-rel
Rea-Lo
Reactine
rebamipide (INN)
Rebetol
Rebetrol
rebimastat (USAN)
reboxetine (INN)
recainam (INN)
ReciGen (INN)
reclazepam (INN)
recoflavone (INN)
Recombivax HB
Redisol
Redutemp
Redux
ReFacto
Refludan
regadenoson (INN)
regavirumab (INN)
Regitine
Reglan
Regonol
regorafenib (USAN)
regramostim (INN)
regrelor (USAN)
Regroton
Regulace
Regular Iletin
Regulex
Reguloid
Regutol
Rejuva-A
Rela
relacatib (USAN)
Relafen
relcovaptan (INN)
Relenza
Relistor
relomycin (INN)
Relpax

rem
remacemide (INN)
Reme-T
Remeron
remestemcel-L (USAN)
Remicade
remifentanil (INN)
remikiren (INN)
remimazolam (INN)
reminertant (INN)
Reminyl
remiprostol (INN)
Remodulin
remoglifozin (USAN)
remoxipride (INN)
Remsed

ren-reo
Renacidin
Renagel
Renamin
renanolone (INN)
Renedil
Renese
Reno
Renocal
Renografin
Renoquid
Renormax
Renotec
Renova. Redirects to Tretinoin.
Renovist
Renovue
rentiapril (INN)
renytoline (INN)
renzapride (INN)
ReoPro (Eli Lilly). Redirects to abciximab.

rep-res
repagermanium (INN)
repaglinide (INN)
Repan
reparixin (USAN)
repifermin (INN)
repirinast (INN)
repromicin (INN)
Repronex
reproterol (INN)
Requip
Resa
Resaid
resatorvid (USAN)
rescimetol (INN)
rescinnamine (INN)
Rescriptor
Rescula
Resectisol
reserpine (INN)
reslizumab (INN, USAN)
resminostat (INN)
resocortol (INN)
resorantel (INN)
Respbid
RespiGam
Resporal
Restall
Restasis
Restoril

ret-rez
retapamulin (USAN)
retaspimycin (USAN, INN)
Retavase
retelliptine (INN)
reteplase (INN)
Retet
retigabine (INN)
Retin-A
retinol (INN)
Retinova
retosiban (USAN)
Retrovir
Rev-Eyes
revamilast (INN)
revatropate (INN)
revenast (INN)
Reversol
Revex
Revia
reviparin sodium (INN)
Revitropin
revizinone (INN)
revospirone (INN)
Rexomun
Reyataz
rezatomidine (USAN, INN)
Rezipas
Rezulin